George A. Cincotta (December 5, 1914 – April 16, 1985) was an American politician from New York.

Life
Cincotta, an Italian American Democrat, was a member of the New York City Council from Central Brooklyn in 1958.

He was a member of the New York State Assembly from 1959 to 1978, sitting in the 172nd, 173rd, 174th, 175th, 176th, 177th, 178th, 179th, 180th, 181st and 182nd New York State Legislatures. He represented Central Brooklyn, including portions of Crown Heights, Flatbush and Prospect Heights.

In the Assembly he became chairman of the Committee on Banks. Free Checking in New York State came through a bill which he coauthored with Senator William T. Conklin. Cincotta left the Assembly in 1978 to become Chairman of the New York State Commission on Cable Television (CCT) and he retired from that post in 1981.

References

1914 births
1985 deaths
Politicians from Brooklyn
New York City Council members
Democratic Party members of the New York State Assembly
20th-century American politicians